The 1889 Tipperary Senior Hurling Championship was the third staging of the Tipperary Senior Hurling Championship since its establishment by the Tipperary County Board in 1887.

Clonoulty were the defending champions.

Moycarkey won the championship after a 1-03 to 1-00 defeat of Toomevara in the final. It was their first championship title.

CHampionship statistics

Miscellaneous

Clonoulty-Rossmore won the title for the first time and won't win another until 1989.

References

Tipperary
Tipperary Senior Hurling Championship